Retrô Futebol Clube Brasil, commonly known as Retrô, is a Brazilian football club based in Camaragibe, Pernambuco. They compete in the Campeonato Pernambucano.

Players

Squad

Achievements
 Campeonato Pernambucano:
 Runners up (1): 2022

 Campeonato Pernambucano Série A2:
 Runners up (1): 2019

References

Association football clubs established in 2016
2016 establishments in Brazil